The Kolomoki Mounds is one of the largest and earliest Woodland period earthwork mound complexes in the Southeastern United States and is the largest in Georgia. Constructed from 350CE to 600CE, the mound complex is located in southwest Georgia, in present-day Early County near the Chattahoochee River.

The mounds were designated as a National Historic Landmark in 1964. Seven of the eight mounds are protected as part of Kolomoki Mounds State Historic Park.

Site characteristics

Kolomoki Mounds State Park is an important archaeological site as well as a scenic recreational area. Kolomoki, covering some three hundred acres, is one of the larger preserved mound sites in the USA.

In the early millennium of the Common Era, Kolomoki, with its surrounding villages, Native American burial mounds, and ceremonial plaza, was a center of population and activity in North America. The eight visible mounds of earth in the park were built between 250-950 CE by peoples of the Swift Creek and Weeden Island cultures. These mounds include Georgia's oldest great temple mound, built on a flat platform top; two burial mounds, and four smaller ceremonial mounds.

As with other mound complexes, the people sited and built the earthworks according to a complex cosmology. Researchers have noted that several mounds are aligned according to astronomical events. For example, mounds A, D, and E, which form the central axis of the site, align with the sun at the spring equinox. Mounds F and D form an alignment with the sun at the summer solstice.

Soils at the Park are mostly dark red sandy loams or loamy sands of the Americus, Greenville, and Red Bay series. Some pale brown sands of the Troup series occur on the western shores of Kolomoki Lake, and at the northern end of the lake is brown or dark gray alluvial loam of the Herod-Muckalee soil association.

Archaeological features

Temple Mound   
Research indicates that it would have taken over two million basket loads carried by individual workers, each holding one cubic foot of earth, to build this mound. The southern half of the mound is three feet higher and was probably the temple platform. From the top of the steps, most of the Kolomoki Archaeological Area can be viewed. Approximately 1,500 - 2,000 residents lived in a village of thatched houses that were built around the large plaza in the center of the complex. It was a place for public ceremonial activities and rituals, including games.

Mound D
Mound D is one of the eight visible mounds at the Kolomoki site. It is centrally located at Kolomoki. Archeologists discovered the remains of 77 burials and ceremonial pottery here. The effigy pottery discovered was shaped in various animal and bird shapes, such as deer, quail and owls.

Mound D was constructed in several stages, each time increasing in size. This original platform mound was built from yellow clay. Sixty pottery vessels were placed on the east wall including the above effigy pottery.

These burials took place on the eastern side of the mound, and the skulls face eastward, the direction of the rising sun, apparently for religious reasons. Burial objects made from iron and copper and pearl beads were included as ceremonial objects with the burials. Finally, the entire mound was covered with red clay.

Museum 
The park's museum was built to incorporate part of an excavated mound; it provides an authentic setting for viewing artifacts. The museum features a film about how this mound was built and excavated.

In March 1974, a thief entered the museum at the park and stole more than 129 ancient pots and effigies, numerous arrowheads, and other treasures. Every artifact on display was stolen. Several years later, many of the pieces were recovered by police and dealers in Miami and St. Augustine, Florida. But, with more than 70 relics still missing, the Georgia Department of Natural Resources (DNR) has sought public help in recovering these artifacts. Archeologists believe the pots are somewhere in Georgia or Florida, perhaps held by dealers or private collectors.

Park Manager Matt Bruner said,

These pieces are an important part of North American history and should be properly protected for future generations to study. They have significant meaning to the Native American people because many were used during burial ceremonies, plus they represent some of the finest craftsmanship of the Kolomoki culture.

He emphasized that the state is more interested in recovering the pots than prosecuting the people who have them.

Gallery

See also
 Etowah Indian Mounds
 Ocmulgee Mounds National Historical Park 
 List of National Historic Landmarks in Georgia (U.S. state)
 National Register of Historic Places listings in Early County, Georgia

References

External links

 "Kolomoki Mounds State Park", Georgia State Parks
 Kolomoki PDF
 website about missing artifacts
 "Kolomoki Mounds Historic Park", Explore Southern History 
 "Kolomoki", New Georgia Encyclopedia
 The Kolomoki Indian Mounds historical marker
 "Kolomoki Mounds Archaeological Area", Georgia state historical marker
 "Kolomoki Mounds State Park", Georgia state historical marker

Swift Creek culture
Weeden Island culture
Archaeological sites in Georgia (U.S. state)
National Historic Landmarks in Georgia (U.S. state)
State parks of Georgia (U.S. state)
Archaeological museums in Georgia (U.S. state)
Native American museums in Georgia (U.S. state)
Museums in Early County, Georgia
Protected areas established in 1964
Protected areas of Early County, Georgia
Archaeological sites on the National Register of Historic Places in Georgia (U.S. state)
Landforms of Early County, Georgia
National Register of Historic Places in Early County, Georgia